Events in the year 2002 in Norway.

Incumbents
 Monarch – Harald V
 Prime Minister – Kjell Magne Bondevik (Christian Democratic Party)

Events

February
 27 February – Metropol TV ceases broadcasting because of financial difficulties.

March

April

May
 24 May – Ari Behn marries Princess Märtha Louise of Norway in Nidaros Cathedral in Trondheim.

June

 June – World Bank Oslo 2002 Protests

July

August

September

October

November

December

Popular culture

Sports

Music

Film

Literature
Lars Saabye Christensen is awarded the Nordic Council Literature Prize, for The Half Brother.

Television

Notable births

21 February – Marcus & Martinus Gunnarsen, two identical brothers singers
12 May – Birgitta Elisa Oftestad, cellist

Notable deaths

1 January – Arne Røgden, bobsledder (born 1917)
24 January – Ragnar Horn, politician (born 1913)
31 January – Jens P. Flå, politician (born 1923)
1 February – Sigurd Berge, composer (born 1928)
18 April – Thor Heyerdahl, ethnographer and adventurer (born 1914)
29 April – Sverre Bratland, military leader (born 1917)
1 May – Birger Tvedt, physician (born 1910).
28 May – Kai Paulsen, journalist, photographer and computer collector (born 1947)
29 June – Ole-Johan Dahl, computer scientist (born 1931)
10 August – Kristen Nygaard, mathematician, computer programming language pioneer and politician (born 1926)
26 September – Eleonore Bjartveit, politician and Minister (born 1924)
10 October – Sverre L. Mo, politician (born 1915)
15 November – Hans Jørgen Toming, visual artist and designer (b. 1933).
24 November – Odd Lien, newspaper editor and politician (born 1915)
5 December – Magnar Sætre, politician (born 1940)
20 December – Tore Tønne, politician and Minister (born 1948)
21 December – Harald U. Lied, politician (born 1927)
24 December – Kjell Aukrust, author, poet and artist (born 1920).

Full date unknown
Odd Chr. Gøthe, civil servant and politician (born 1919)
Johan Berthin Holte, businessperson (born 1915)
Nils Peder Langvand, judge (born 1929)
Oddrunn Pettersen, politician and Minister (born 1937)
Fritz Røed, sculptor (born 1928)
Einar Skinnarland, resistance fighter (born 1918)
Knut Tjønneland, politician (born 1907)

See also

References

External links

 
Norway
Norway